Jonathan Jeremiah is a British singer-songwriter from North London. He has released five studio albums.

Career

Jeremiah's debut album, A Solitary Man, was released in 2011 on Island Records, followed by his second album, Gold Dust, in 2012. His second album was recorded with the Netherlands-based Metropole Orkest.

His third album, Oh Desire, was released in 2015 on Universal Music. In 2018, he released his fourth album, titled Good Day.

Discography

Albums

Singles

Awards and nominations

References

External links
Official website

Year of birth missing (living people)
Living people
British male singer-songwriters